Thomas Knyvet or Knyvett is the name of:

Thomas Knyvett (died 1569), MP for Brackley (UK Parliament constituency), Bramber and Plymouth
Thomas Knyvet, 1st Baron Knyvet (1558–1622), English nobleman, MP for Westmorland and Westminster
Thomas Knyvett (died 1512), English nobleman
Thomas Knyvett, 4th Baron Berners (1539–1616), English nobleman
Thomas Knyvet (died 1605), MP for Aldeburgh and Thetford
Thomas Knyvett (parliamentary official) (died 1637), English parliamentary officer
Thomas Knyvett, 5th Baron Berners (1598-1658), JP and Royalist
Thomas Knyvett, 7th Baron Berners (c. 1660–1693), English nobleman